Headlight covers are aftermarket modifications made from a variety of materials (e.g., metal, polycarbonate, ABS plastic or self-adhesive vinyl film) which are applied over the headlamps of a car in order to reduce the percentage of light transmitted, to tint the color of the light transmitted and/or to protect the lenses from stone chips, bug splatters, pedestrians and minor abrasions.

Wartime origins

During World War II, civil and military authorities often enforced brownout and blackouts, restricting the use of lights on transports and passenger vehicles in order to hinder detection by aerial reconnaissance and bombers. Blackouts (turning off lights) and brownouts (limiting light emissions by way of hoods and masks) were enforced in cities and coastal areas as protection against the night-time aerial attacks in both Axis and Allied countries. One of the first civilian examples of headlight covers was produced in NSW, Australia by the Read family dairy.

Evolution of headlight covers

The use of headlight covers and the modification of light produced by vehicles has continued into the present day in both the military's development of special blackout head and tail light technologies and in the civilian sector as well. In addition to headlight covers' use in light reduction, they have also been employed to protect headlamps from damage in both civilian and combat environments. As of 2014, 3M makes a wide variety of aerospace and military films solely for this purpose.

Eventually, the automobile industry began to take note of the protective benefits of headlight cover film, and it was soon being employed by race car drivers despite the difficulty of working with the original films. According to Kay Lam, marketing manager for the automotive division of 3M, "The first films were thicker and less compliant, [because] their purpose was to help keep...[surfaces] from eroding in the harsh, sandy environments to which they were exposed."

Legality
As of 2014, there is no statute which governs the use of headlight covers throughout the United States. Most localities and municipalities will have laws which regulate the use of headlight covers and or tint and will specify the percentage of light that must pass through and/or the minimum distance from which a vehicle's headlights must be visible.

References

Automotive accessories